In enzymology, a rubredoxin-NAD+ reductase is an enzyme that catalyzes the chemical reaction.

2 reduced rubredoxin + NAD+ + H+  2 oxidized rubredoxin + NADH

The 3 substrates of this enzyme are reduced rubredoxin, NAD+, and H+, whereas its two products are oxidized rubredoxin and NADH.

This enzyme belongs to the family of oxidoreductases, specifically those acting on iron-sulfur proteins as donor with NAD+ or NADP+ as acceptor. The systematic name of this enzyme class is rubredoxin:NAD+ oxidoreductase. Other names in common use include rubredoxin reductase, rubredoxin-nicotinamide adenine dinucleotide reductase, dihydronicotinamide adenine dinucleotide-rubredoxin reductase, reduced nicotinamide adenine dinucleotide-rubredoxin reductase, NADH-rubredoxin reductase, rubredoxin-NAD reductase, NADH: rubredoxin oxidoreductase, DPNH-rubredoxin reductase, and NADH-rubredoxin oxidoreductase. This enzyme participates in fatty acid metabolism. It has 2 cofactors: FAD and Iron.

Structural studies

As of late 2007, only one structure has been solved for this class of enzymes, with the PDB accession code .

References

 
 
 
 

EC 1.18.1
NADH-dependent enzymes
Flavoproteins
Iron enzymes
Enzymes of known structure